Maize white line mosaic virus (MWLMV) is a pathogenic plant virus.

External links
ICTVdB - The Universal Virus Database: Maize white line mosaic virus
Family Groups - The Baltimore Method

Viral plant pathogens and diseases